Bottelare is a village in the province of East Flanders, Belgium, at the edge of the Flemish Ardennes. It is now part of the municipality of Merelbeke.

During the 17th century, Bottelare became a famous pilgrimage place, dedicated to Saint Anne. Its gorgeous hall church, a large statue of Saint Anne and the Saint Anne Chapel in the village centre are witnesses of this.

Places of interest

References

External links 
 Webpage at Reocities

Populated places in East Flanders
Merelbeke